Sky – It's Me - (Russian: Небо - это Я/Nebo - eto Ya) is a 2004 song performed by Sofia Rotaru in Russian.

Albums 

The song "Sky - It's Me" is included in following studio albums:

 Sky - It's Me 2004(4-th track)
 Fog 2007 (10th track)

Music video 

Music video "Sky - It's Me" was filmed in the Yusupov Palace and in Stockholm and released in Saint-Petersburg.

Performances 

Sofia Rotaru performed this song at an open-air concert in Kyiv, in Independence Square in 2006 (the appearance of Sofia Rotaru was organised by Ukrainian TV channel Inter), at numerous solo concerts and tours during 2004-2007, in duet with Stas Pieha at Star Factory, as well as at Blue Light 2004 on Russian TV Channel "Russia".

Sofia Rotaru songs
2004 songs